Kamal Boullata (1942 − August 6, 2019) was a Palestinian artist and art historian. His works were primarily done in acrylic. His work was abstract in style, focusing on the ideas of division in Palestinian identity, separation from homeland. He expressed these ideas through geometric forms as well as through the integration of Arabic words and calligraphy.

Biography
Kamal Boullata was born in Jerusalem in 1942. Boullata recalls sitting for hours on end as a small boy in front of the Dome of the Rock, engrossed in sketching its innumerable and unfathomable geometric patterns and calligraphic engravings. Those patterns he saw as a child still echo endlessly throughout his adult work. In an interview he recalled "I keep reminding my self that Jerusalem is not behind me, it is constantly ahead of me."  

He studied at the Fine Arts Academy in Rome and at the Corcoran School of the Arts and Design, Washington, D.C. In 1993 and 1994 Kamal was awarded Fulbright Senior Scholarships to conduct research on Islamic art in Morocco. Kamal, whose work has been exhibited throughout Europe, the United States and the Middle East, lived and worked in Menton in Southern France, and now in Berlin, Germany.  

Kamal Boullata was a fellow resident at The Wissenschaftskolleg zu Berlin (Institute for Advanced Study, Berlin).

Style
Boullata works mainly in silk screen. His compositions are based on the angular Kufic script, embedded in geometric designs, which he uses as a representational form of art. His choice of subject matter is primarily around themes of Palestinian identity and the conditions of exile.  

Due to his use of Arabic calligraphy as a graphic form, he has been as part of the Hurufiyya Art Movement.

Reviews
In a review of his work, Moroccan art critic Abdelkebir Khatibi wrote: 

 “Elaborated with remarkable continuity and patience, Boullata's work is that of a surveyor, an artist of proportion and measurement. Behind this passion for geometry lies the tradition of icon-painting, which forged the beginnings of his artistic training, a tradition that has maintained a venerable continuity between Byzantium and the Arabo-Islamic civilization of the Middle East.”  

Sultan Sooud Al Qassemi noted: "Kamal was simply a giant of art & culture of our age. Not only was Kamal an accomplished artist, he was also the author of what is perhaps the most important book on the subject of Modern and contemporary art from Palestine, titled: Palestinian Art: from 1850 to the Present."

Steve Sabella noted just after Boullata's death: "I had dinner with Kamal three weeks ago just before I left for Jerusalem, the city of our birth. He looked young, energised, inspired, speaking about many projects. From the moment we met in 2002, any conversation with Kamal ignited my imagination. Only beauty emerges when one delves into his art and listens to his carefully chosen words -words that I felt always came out from the heart. Kamal inspired thousands in his life, and I do feel his journey has just begun. Kamal's departure is not a loss, but a reward to all humanity."

Public collections
Public collections holding his art
Arab American National Museum, Dearborn, Michigan
British Museum, London
Institut du Monde Arabe, Paris
Jordan National Gallery
The Khalid Shoman Foundation
Sharjah Art Museum
Sarjah and the Bibliotheque Louis Notari, Monaco

Books
 Between Exits: Paintings by Hani Zurob Black Dog Publishing London 2012 (in English)
 Palestinian Art: From 1850 to the Present, Saqi Press,  2009, London (in English)
 Belonging and Globalisation: Critical Essays in Contemporary Art and Culture, Saqi Press 2008, London. (in English)
 Recovery of Place: A Study of Contemporary Palestinian Art (in Arabic)

See also

 Islamic art
 Islamic calligraphy

References
 

1942 births
2019 deaths
Muslim artists
Palestinian contemporary artists
People from Jerusalem